Gary Germaine (born 2 August 1976) is a former professional footballer, who played for Scunthorpe United and Shrewsbury Town in the Football League. He also played in the US for Wichita Wings, Major Indoor Soccer League, Kansas City Wizards, Major League Soccer and Nashville Metros - USL1. After retiring from Soccer, Germaine spent a brief time trying his hand at becoming an NFL field goal kicker with the Tennessee Titans.

References

External links

1976 births
Living people
English footballers
West Bromwich Albion F.C. players
Telford United F.C. players
Scunthorpe United F.C. players
Shrewsbury Town F.C. players
English Football League players
Association football goalkeepers
Scotland under-21 international footballers
Footballers from Birmingham, West Midlands